Of Feline Bondage is a Tom and Jerry cartoon released in 1965, directed and produced by Chuck Jones, with animation by Ben Washam, Ken Harris, Don Towsley, Tom Ray and Dick Thompson.

Plot
Jerry runs in the house's pool room and into a can that Tom is holding. Tom starts shaking the can, then tips poor Jerry out against the wall, turning the mouse into a cube. Jerry pops back to normal and then runs along near the pool table, inadvertently running up a cue stick placed by Tom, and then onto a cue ball on one of the tables. Tom shoots and breaks the cue ball into the rack until Jerry gets bopped on the head by the cue ball. Then the 8-ball lands right next to Jerry, following him around the table and into his hole, where it squashes Jerry flat. Jerry shrugs in misery until his fairy godmouse appears before him and heals him of his injury.

Jerry acts out the situation in front of her; watching that, the godmouse gives Jerry a bottle of potion, explaining its effects to him in inaudible whispers. They exchange evil grins, and as Jerry thanks her she disappears. He then pokes his head out of his hole, where he sees cheese attached to a fishing rod held by Tom. Jerry drinks the potion, which renders him invisible, and leaves his hole unseen. He slowly unties the line and takes the cheese while Tom looks on in wonder, dropping the rod. As the cat lies down with his face near the mouse hole, Jerry grabs the line at the end of the rod and, lassoing Tom's nose, loops the line over his neck, pulling his nose up. Tom looks in astonishment before the mouse ties Tom's tail in a knot and then comes around the corner carrying a pair of scissors. Seeing the blades snipping in his direction, Tom screams, escapes the fishing line and rockets up to the attic, while the scissors barely cut off his tail hairs.

Tom hides behind a trunk in the attic. Hearing a sound, he then pokes his head out and has enough time to look in horror before the scissors cut off half of his whiskers. Jerry then scissors Tom's scalp bald. Tom rockets down the stairs and hides in a vase, with only his tail sticking out. Clipping sounds are heard, and Tom brings his tail down to see that the end has been cut into a fir tree-like pattern. The invisible mouse then dives into the vase with the scissors, and the vase bounces around the floor cracking rapidly while hairs shoot out. The vase comes to a stop and then breaks to reveal Tom, with his remaining whiskers cut short, his arms and legs shaved, and his chest and pelvis shaved to resemble gray shorts and a white tank top. With a sour look, he adjusts his left "shoulder strap".

Invisible Jerry laughs at his handiwork, holding the scissors, but then the potion wears off, rendering him visible again. Tom slowly grins wickedly before he holds out a mirror at Jerry. Jerry notices and slows laughing as he realizes. Tom then grabs Jerry and the scissors and gives him a taste of his own medicine by cutting off most of Jerry's fur, leaving him looking like he has pigtails and a bikini. As Tom laughs at his handiwork, Jerry quickly joins in upon seeing his reflection. After a few seconds of mutual laughter, Jerry poses seductively, fluttering his eyelashes. This is too much for Tom, who bursts out laughing. Both he and Jerry roll on the floor in hysterics. They briefly stop and look at each other, and continue to roll on the floor laughing as the cartoon closes.

Production notes
Of Feline Bondage revisits plot elements from The Invisible Mouse (1947) and Cue Ball Cat (1950), both directed by William Hanna and Joseph Barbera. The title of the cartoon alludes to the novel Of Human Bondage by Somerset Maugham, and the 1964 film of the same name. This is also the only Tom and Jerry cartoon written by Don Towsley.

Crew
Story: Don Towsley, Chuck Jones
Animation: Ben Washam, Ken Harris, Don Towsley, Tom Ray, & Dick Thompson.
Backgrounds: Robert Gribbroek
Vocal effects: June Foray as Jerry’s Godmother, Mel Blanc as Tom,  William Hanna as Tom (archival recording)
In Charge of Production: Les Goldman
Co-Director and Layouts: Maurice Noble
Music: Eugene Poddany
Produced and Directed by Chuck Jones

External links

1965 animated films
1965 films
1965 short films
Tom and Jerry short films
Short films directed by Chuck Jones
Films scored by Eugene Poddany
1960s American animated films
1965 comedy films
Animated films without speech
Films about invisibility
Films directed by Maurice Noble
Metro-Goldwyn-Mayer short films
Metro-Goldwyn-Mayer animated short films
MGM Animation/Visual Arts short films